Council elections for the Borough of Chorley were held on 6 May 2021 as part of the 2021 United Kingdom local elections.

Due to new boundaries for the district, all wards elected three councillors at this election before returning to its normal cycle of electing a third of councillors each year.

The result was a hold for the ruling Labour group.

Results summary

The results of the 2021 elections are summarised below.

Ward results

Adlington & Anderton

Buckshaw & Whittle

Chorley East

Chorley North & Astley

Chorley North East

Chorley North West

Chorley South East & Heath Charnock

Chorley South West

Clayton East, Brindle & Hoghton

Clayton West & Cuerden

 
 }
 }
 
 
 }

Coppull

Croston, Mawdesley & Euxton South

Eccleston, Heskin & Charnock Richard

Euxton

References

Chorley
2021
May 2021 events in the United Kingdom
2020s in Lancashire